South Tasman Rise Commonwealth Marine Reserve is a 27,704 km2 marine protected area located at the southerly limit of Australia's exclusive economic zone near Tasmania. The reserve was established in 2007 and is part of the South-east Commonwealth Marine Reserve Network.

Some of the seamounts within the reserve have flat summits, which indicates that they were exposed above the surface at some time.

Protection
The entirety of the South Tasman Rise marine reserve area is IUCN protected area category VI and is zoned as 'Special Purpose'.

See also

 Commonwealth marine reserves
 Protected areas of Australia
 Tasman Sea

Notes

References

External links
 South Tasman Rise Commonwealth Marine Reserve Network website

South-east Commonwealth Marine Reserves Network
Protected areas established in 2007